St. Xavier's Loyola Hall is a Catholic school that offers primary, secondary and higher secondary education in Ahmedabad, Gujarat, India. Since 2006, it has been a co-educational school; prior to 2006, it was an all-boys school.

In 2020, Father Xavier Amalraj S.J. was appointed principal of the school. In 2016, Mrs. Laxmi Iyer was appointed the headmistress of the primary school.

History 
St. Xavier's Loyola Hall was founded by Father Fernando Arellano S.J. on December 3, 1956. An outreach program in the 1960s led by the students and faculty of St. Xavier's Loyola Hall inspired the establishment of the St. Xavier's Social Service Society, a charitable Jesuit organization.

The St. Xavier's Loyola Hall primary school was designed by Hasmukh C. Patel.

Academics 
St. Xavier's Loyola Hall offers K-12 education with each standard consisting of three sections offering English medium instruction and one section offering Gujarati medium instruction. It offers science and commerce streams for standard 11 and 12.

Facilities 

St Xavier's Loyola Hall provides students with the following facilities:

 Library
 Laboratories for physics, chemistry and biology
 Laboratory for computer science
 Cricket ground
 Football ground
 Hockey ground
 Tennis courts
 Basketball courts
 Gymnasium
 Skating rinks
 Brother Bou pavilion
 Swimming pool
 Paleta courts
 Table tennis facilities
 Book store
 Canteen
 Auditorium

Notable alumni 
The following individuals have attended St. Xavier's Loyola Hall:

 Geet Sethi (former world billiards champion, recipient of the Arjuna Award, the Padma Shri Award, the K.K. Birla Award and the Rajiv Gandhi Khel Ratna Award)
 Bimal Patel (recipient of the Padma Shri Award)
 Mervin D'Souza (geologist, led the 20th Indian Scientific Expedition to Antarctica)
 Vinod Kinariwala (Independence activist and freedom fighter)

See also

 List of Jesuit schools
 List of schools in Gujarat
 Violence against Christians in India

References  

Jesuit secondary schools in India
Educational institutions established in 1956
Jesuit primary schools in India
Christian schools in Gujarat
1956 establishments in Bombay State